Léonard Besabotsy (born 6 June 1993) is a Malagasy football defender who currently plays for Foresters.

References

1993 births
Living people
Malagasy footballers
Madagascar international footballers
AS Adema players
St Michel United FC players
Association football defenders
Malagasy expatriate footballers
Expatriate footballers in Seychelles
Malagasy expatriate sportspeople in Seychelles
People from Sava Region